The 1972 Bristol Open, also known by its sponsored name W.D. & H.O. Wills Open Tournament, was a men's tennis tournament played on outdoor grass courts. The event was part of the 1972 Commercial Union Assurance Grand Prix circuit and classified as C category. It was played in Bristol, Great Britain and was held from 12 to 17 June 1972. Bob Hewitt won the singles title and earned $7,800 first-prize money.

Finals

Singles

 Bob Hewitt defeated  Alejandro Olmedo 6–4, 6–3
 It was Hewitt's 5th title of the year and the 7th of his career.

Doubles

 Bob Hewitt /  Frew McMillan defeated  Clark Graebner /  Lew Hoad 
 It was Hewitt's 4th title of the year and the 6th of his career. It was McMillan's 3rd title of the year and the 5th of his career.

References

External links
 ITF tournament edition details

 
Bristol Open
Bristol Open
Bristol Open
Bristol Open